Bauerlein is a surname. Notable people with the surname include:

 Mark Bauerlein (born 1959), English professor and editor
 Monika Bauerlein (born 1965), American journalist
  (born 1944), German politician